Cold Springs Cemetery (also known as Cold Spring Cemetery) is a historic cemetery located at Lockport in Niagara County, New York.  Among the prominent burials are Erie Canal proponent Jesse Hawley, Cuthbert W. Pound, Chief Judge of the New York Court of Appeals from 1932 to 1934, and World War II Medal of Honor recipient William F. Leonard.

Incorporated in 1841, the cemetery was listed on the National Register of Historic Places in 2004.

Gallery

References

External links

 
 

Cemeteries on the National Register of Historic Places in New York (state)
1815 establishments in New York (state)
Cemeteries in Niagara County, New York
National Register of Historic Places in Niagara County, New York